Deh Zir (also Romanized as Deh Zīr; also known as Deh Rīz, Deh Zeyd, and Duzīri) is a village in Kavirat Rural District, Chatrud District, Kerman County, Kerman Province, Iran. At the 2006 census, its population was 15, in 5 families.

References 

Populated places in Kerman County